Midway Arcade Origins is an arcade compilation released on November 6, 2012, in North America and in Australia. It is the successor to the Midway Arcade Treasures series, and includes a selection of games that were included in those compilations, with the sole exception of Vindicators Part II which will be included in Midway Arcade Origins. On January 19, 2017, Midway Arcade Origins was added to the Xbox One via the backwards compatibility program.

Games 
Thirty-one games are included:
720°
APB
Arch Rivals
Bubbles
Championship Sprint
Defender
Defender II
Gauntlet
Gauntlet II
Joust
Joust 2
Marble Madness
Pit-Fighter
Rampage
Rampart
Robotron: 2084
Root Beer Tapper
Satan's Hollow
Sinistar
Smash TV
Spy Hunter
Spy Hunter II
Super Off Road
Super Sprint
Toobin'
Total Carnage
Tournament Cyberball 2072
Vindicators Part II
Wizard of Wor
Xenophobe
Xybots

Reception
On Metacritic, a review aggregator, the Xbox 360 version has a score of 61/100 from eleven reviews, and the PS3 version has a score of 58/100 from four reviews.  In IGNs review, Samuel Claiborn wrote the collection features great games, but technical problems – including poor controls – makes the online leaderboards the only reason to play it.

References

2012 video games
Midway video game compilations
PlayStation 3 games
Video games developed in the United States
Warner Bros. video games
Xbox 360 games